The fourth season of Chuck was announced on May 13, 2010. Having initially ordered 13 episodes, NBC ordered an additional 11 on October 19, 2010 for a total of 24 episodes.
Throughout the season, Chuck faced individual villains: Alexei Volkoff, head of Volkoff Industries, and Volkoff's daughter, Vivian McArthur.

Josh Schwartz and Chris Fedak expressed a desire to continue the series past the fourth season as early as March 2011, when it was announced that the season finale would be titled "Chuck Versus the Cliffhanger". The episode, as the title suggests, had a cliffhanger ending leading into the fifth and final season, which was ordered on May 13, 2011.

Cast and characters

Main cast 
 Zachary Levi as Agent Chuck Bartowski (24 episodes)
 Yvonne Strahovski as Agent Sarah Walker (24 episodes)
 Adam Baldwin as Colonel John Casey (24 episodes)
 Joshua Gomez as Morgan Grimes (24 episodes)
 Ryan McPartlin as Dr. Devon Woodcomb (18 episodes)
 Mark Christopher Lawrence as Michael "Big Mike" Tucker (16 episodes)
 Scott Krinsky as Jeffrey Barnes (18 episodes)
 Vik Sahay as Lester Patel (18 episodes)
 Bonita Friedericy as Diane Beckman (21 episodes)
 Sarah Lancaster as Dr. Ellie Woodcomb (21 episodes)

Supporting cast 
 Mekenna Melvin as Alex McHugh (12 episodes)
 Linda Hamilton as Mary Elizabeth Bartowski (11 episodes)
 Timothy Dalton as Alexei Volkoff (6 episodes)
 Olivia Munn, Isaiah Mustafa, Stacy Keibler, and Summer Glau as "Greta" (5 episodes)
 Lauren Cohan as Vivian McArthur (5 episodes)
 Robin Givens as Jane Bentley (3 episodes)
 Ray Wise as Riley (3 episodes)
 Richard Chamberlain as The Belgian (2 episodes)
 Mini Anden as Carina Miller (2 episodes)

Episodes

Reception

US Nielsen ratings

UK BARB ratings

Home media release

References

External links 
 

 

2010 American television seasons
2011 American television seasons